Rıza Mahmut Türmen (born 17 June 1941, Istanbul, Turkey), is a former judge of the European Court of Human Rights and currently an MP for Izmir in the Turkish Parliament, with the Republican People's Party.

He graduated from Istanbul University law faculty in 1964. He took a master's degree in at McGill University, Montreal, before doing his doctorate at Ankara University faculty of political science.

Türmen has held various positions at the Turkish Ministry of Foreign Affairs, which he joined in 1966. In 1978, he was appointed Turkey's representative to the International Civil Aviation Organization. He was ambassador to Singapore in 1985. From 1989 to 1994 he worked in Ankara as the Director General responsible for the Council of Europe, United Nations, Organization for Security and Co-operation in Europe and human rights. From 1995 to 1996 he was ambassador to Switzerland at Bern. Between 1996 and 1997, Türmen was the Permanent Representative of Turkey to the Council of Europe. From 1998 to 2008, he was the Turkish judge for the European Court of Human Rights.

Since his retirement he has written a column for the Turkish newspaper Milliyet. Rıza Türmen is also known as a campaigner for the independence of the judiciary in Turkey.

He is married to Dr Tomris Türmen. The couple has one daughter.

Awards
 Turkish Bar Association Lawyer of the Year, 2009
 Middle East Technical University Distinguished Service Award, 2009
 Turkish Journalists Association Freedom of the Press Award, 2009

Articles and publications
 "Contemporary issues in human rights", Perceptions, Journal of International Affairs, 1997
 "On multiculturalism", Perceptions, Journal of International Affairs, 1998-1999

References

1941 births
Living people
Judges of the European Court of Human Rights
Turkish judges
20th-century Turkish diplomats
21st-century Turkish journalists
Academics from Istanbul
Istanbul University Faculty of Law alumni
McGill University alumni
Ankara University Faculty of Political Sciences alumni
Deputies of Izmir
Contemporary Republican People's Party (Turkey) politicians
Milliyet people
Permanent Representatives of Turkey to the International Civil Aviation Organization
Ambassadors of Turkey to Singapore
Ambassadors of Turkey to Switzerland
Members of the 24th Parliament of Turkey
Turkish judges of international courts and tribunals